Kadiri revenue division is an administrative division in the Sri Sathya Sai district of the Indian state of Andhra Pradesh. It is one of the 4 revenue divisions in the district with 32 mandals under its administration. The divisional headquarters is located at Kadiri.

Administration 

There are 8 mandals administered under Anantapur revenue division.  Their headquarters are:

See also 
List of revenue divisions in Andhra Pradesh

References 

Revenue divisions in Sri Sathya Sai district